is a city located in Gunma Prefecture, Japan. , the city had an estimated population of 224,358 in 109,541 households, and a population density of 1300 persons per km2.

Geography
Ōta is located in the extreme southeastern portion of Gunma Prefecture in the northern Kantō Plains, bordered by Tochigi Prefecture to the east and Saitama Prefecture to the south. It is located about 80 kilometers northwest of central Tokyo, about 30 kilometers east of the prefectural capital at Maebashi, about 40 kilometers east of Takasaki.
The elevation of the city ranges from 30–40 meters in lowland in the south, southwest, northeast, and east, to 40–70 meters in the northwest.

Surrounding municipalities
Gunma Prefecture
 Isesaki
 Kiryū
 Midori
 Ōizumi
 Ōra
Tochigi Prefecture
 Ashikaga
Saitama Prefecture
 Kumagaya
 Fukaya

Climate
Ōta has a Humid continental climate (Köppen Cfa) characterized by warm summers and cold winters with heavy snowfall.  The average annual temperature in Ōta is 14.4 °C. The average annual rainfall is 1260 mm with September as the wettest month. The temperatures are highest on average in August, at around 26.7 °C, and lowest in January, at around 3.5 °C.

Demographics
Per Japanese census data, the population of Ōta has increased steadily over the past 60 years.

History

Ōta Town was created within Nitta District, Gunma Prefecture on April 1, 1889 with the creation of the modern municipalities system after the Meiji Restoration. On April 1, 1940, Ōta merged with the villages of Kuai and Sawano from Nitta District, and with the village of Niragawa from Yamada District. On November 1, 1943, Ōta absorbed the village of Shimanogō, also from Nitta District. Ōta was elevated to city status on May 3, 1948. The city expanded on April 1, 1957, by annexing the village of Kyodo (from Nitta District), and the village of Kyūhaku (from Yamada District), and by annexing parts of the village of Yabakawa (Yamada District) on July 1, 1960. On April 1, 1963, Ōta absorbed the village of Hosen (Nitta District), followed by the village of Kesatoda (Yamada District) on December 1, 1963.

On March 28, 2005, the old city of Ōta absorbed the towns of Nitta, Ojima, and Yabuzukahon (all from Nitta District), and the area became the new city of Ōta. The former city of Ōta had a population of 152,000, with a total area of 97.96 km2; after the merger the total area became 176.49 km2, and the population went to 217,000 people. On April 1, 2007, Ōta was designated special city (tokureishi) with expanded local autonomy.

Government
Ōta has a mayor-council form of government with a directly elected mayor and a unicameral city council of 30 members. Ōta contributes five members to the Gunma Prefectural Assembly. In terms of national politics, the city is part of Gunma 3rd district of the lower house of the Diet of Japan.

Economy
During the years before World War II, airplane production by Nakajima Aircraft Company was the industrial mainstay of Ōta. After the war, much of the skills and technology used in the production of aircraft was redirected into the production of automobiles.
Ōta's leading industry is manufacturing, centered in the southeast part of the city. Ōta leads the prefecture in manufacturing revenue, which exceeds  annually. Subaru-chō is where the Subaru BRZ/Toyota 86 is built, having been re-purposed from kei car production, Yajima Plant is where all current Subaru cars are built, Otakita Plant is where commercial kei trucks are built (originally the location of Nakajima Aircraft), and Oizumi Plant is where engines and transmissions are built.

The northern part of Ōta is characterized by its farms, most of which produce rice. Also, Ōta is a major transportation hub in the Tomo (Eastern Gunma) region and the home of the Panasonic Wild Knights rugby team.

Education

University
Kanto Gakuen University

Primary and secondary schools
Ōta has 26 public elementary schools and 17 public middle schools operated by the city government, and seven public high schools operated by the Gunma Prefectural Board of Education. There is also one private high school and the Gunma Kokusai Academy, a private combined elementary/middle/high school which offers a curriculum in the English language. The prefecture also operates two special education schools for the handicapped.

International schools
 EAS Rede Pitágoras - Brazilian school - Formerly Colégio Pitágoras Brasil
 Escola Paralelo (エスコーラ・パラレロ 太田校) - Brazilian primary school

Transportation

Railway
 Tōbu Railway – Isesaki Line
  -  -  -  - 
 Tōbu Railway  – Tōbu Kiryū Line
  -  -  - 
 Tōbu Railway – Koizumi Line
  -

Highway
  – Ōta-Yabuzuka Interchange – Ōta-Gōdo Parking Area and Smart Interchange – Ōta-Kiryū Interchange

Local attractions
Daikoin Temple - Founded in 1618 by Ieyasu Tokugawa. Popular with nickname Kosodate Donryu (meaning kid-raising Saint Donryu). Located 2.4 km northwest of the downtown.
 Kanayama Castle ruins - A Kamakura period castle on the top of Mt. Kanayama (244 m). Located 3.2 km north of the downtown. Mt. Kanayama is the symbol of Ota City. A National Historic Site
Tenjinyama Kofun - A large ancient burial mound (from around the 5th century). The haniwa unearthed in Ota are the only haniwa to be designated as national treasures, and are on display in the National Museum in Tokyo.
Yabuzuka Onsen - Ōta's hot springs; 9.7 km northwest of the downtown.
Snake Center - Located in Yabuzuka Onsen area. Famous for collection of rare kinds of snakes.
Nyotaizan Kofun and Tenjinyama Kofun - Kofun period tumuli, a National Historic Sites
Kōzuke Province Nitta District Offices Site - Nara period ruins, a National Historic Site
Nitta-no-shō - sites and ruins associated with a Heian through Muromachi period manor, a National Historic Site

Sister-city relations
 - Burbank, California, United States; since February 1984. Switching off each year, the two cities send students to each other in order to strengthen relations and teach the next generation about the differing cultures.
 - Lafayette, West Lafayette and Tippecanoe County, Indiana, United States; memorandum of understanding signed October 1988, agreement signed October 1993.
 Imabari, Ehime, Japan; since April 2002.

Ota entered into a friendship agreement with Yingkou, Liaoning, China in September 1987. The city has also commenced an exchange relationship with Guilin, in the Guangxi Zhuang Autonomous Region, China in 1997 and signed a friendship agreement with Hirosaki city, Aomori Prefecture in November 2006.

Notable people
Masaaki Ōsawa, politician
Chikuhei Nakajima, founder of Nakajima Aircraft, politician
Aya Uchida, voice actress
Chiezō Kataoka, actor
Rentarō Mikuni, actor
Itsuki Shoda, professional baseball player
Yuki Saito, professional baseball player
Ayumi Morita, tennis player
Mari Katayama, artist

References

External links

Official Website 
 

Cities in Gunma Prefecture
Ōta, Gunma
Subaru